Illusion Labs is a developer and publisher of video games, based in Malmö, Sweden. Illusion Labs was founded in autumn of 2007.

They create applications and games for iOS and Android, combining engineering and aesthetics. Illusion Labs specializes in graphics, physics simulation, and novel interaction such as accelerometer and multi-touch. They exclusively make in-house productions and no contract work.

Products 
Illusion Labs has produced a number of games for different platforms.
Labyrinth (2008)
 Touchgrind (2008)
 Sway (2009)
 Labyrinth 2 (2009)
 Foosball (2010)
 Blast-A-Way (2012)
 Mr. Crab (2013)
 Touchgrind Skate 2 (2013)
 Rocket Cars (2014)
 Touchgrind BMX (2014)
 Nono Islands (2015)
 Mr. Crab 2 (2016)
 Bacon Escape (2017)
 Bacon Escape 2 (2018)
 Touchgrind BMX 2 (2018)
 Way of the Turtle (2019)

References

External links 
 Illusion Labs official website

Video game companies of Sweden
Video game development companies